Melpo Kosti (Greek: Μέλπω Κωστή; Athens, 26 November 1964) is a Greek television and soap opera actress, currently appearing on Erotas. She is best known for her roles in
such TV series as Synora Agapis and Pathos.

Selected filmography
Erotas (2005) TV Series .... Elena Hatzigianni (2007–present)
Mi mou les adio (2004) TV Series .... Filippos' mother (2004–2006)
Kaneis de leei s' agapo (2004) TV Series .... Katerina
Epta thanasimes petheres (TV series) (1 episode)
Mistika kai lathi (2003) TV Series
Peri anemon kai ydaton (2000) TV Series .... Mairi
Synora agapis (1999) TV Series
Pathos (1993) TV Series .... Eva
Tis Ellados ta paidia (1993) TV Series (unknown episodes)

External links
 

Living people
Greek television actresses
Greek film actresses
Greek stage actresses
Actresses from Athens
1964 births